The Boeing 929 Jetfoil are passenger-carrying, waterjet-propelled hydrofoils by Boeing.

Boeing adapted many systems used in jet airplanes for hydrofoils. Robert Bateman led development. Boeing launched its first passenger-carrying waterjet-propelled hydrofoil in April 1974. It could carry from 167 to 400 passengers. It was based on technology developed for the U.S. Navy patrol hydrofoil Tucumcari, and shared technology with the Pegasus class military patrol hydrofoils. The product line was licensed to the Japanese company Kawasaki Heavy Industries.

Operational history
Boeing launched three Jetfoil 929-100 hydrofoils that were acquired in 1975 for service in the Hawaiian Islands, which was operated by a Honolulu-based operator Seaflite.  Seaflite operated three Boeing 929-100 Jetfoils between 1975 and the company's demise in 1979. When the service ended the three hydrofoils were acquired by Far East Hydrofoil (now TurboJET) for service between Hong Kong and Macau. About two dozen Boeing Jetfoils saw service in Hong Kong-Macau, Japan, South Korea, the English Channel, the Canary Islands, the Korea Strait, Saudi Arabia and Indonesia.

In 1979, the Royal Navy purchased a Boeing Jetfoil, HMS Speedy, to provide the Royal Navy with an opportunity to gain practical experience in the operation and support of a modern hydrofoil, to establish technical and performance characteristics, and to assess the capability of a hydrofoil in the Fishery Protection Squadron.

In 1980 B&I shipping lines opened a Jetfoil service from Dublin to Liverpool with the jetfoil Cú Na Mara (Hound of the Sea). The service was not a success and was discontinued at the end of the 1981 season.

The Belgian Regie voor Maritiem Transport (RMT) operated the jetfoils Princesse Clementine and Prinses Stephanie on the Ostend-Dover route from 1981 until 1997.

In North America, the Boeing Jetfoil saw regularly scheduled service between Seattle, Washington, and Victoria, British Columbia, during the summer tourist season of 1980. Leased from Boeing, a single Jetfoil, the Flying Princess, was operated by the non-profit Flying Princess Transportation Corp., with the close co-operation and assistance of the B.C. Steamship Company. Regularly scheduled service ran from Seattle to Victoria to Vancouver from April to September, 1985, by Island Jetfoil. Boeing reclaimed the Island Jetfoil boat and sold it for service in Japan.

Fleet

Built by Boeing Marine Systems in Renton, Washington

Built under license by Kawasaki Heavy Industries Ltd. in Kobe, Japan

Built under license by Shanghai Simno Marine Ltd. CSSC, China

See also
Boeing hydrofoils
Pegasus class hydrofoil

References

Bibliography

External links

Kawasaki Jetfoil homepage
Boeing history page JETFOIL Historical Snapshot.

Boeing hydrofoils